Álvaro L. Gonçalves is a Brazilian businessman.

Career
He co-founded Stratus Group in 1999, following two years as Managing Director of Pactual Electra Capital Partners – one of the first private equity funds in Brazil. He has also played a leading role in the development of the Brazilian investment environment over the last ten years. He served as Chairman of the Brazilian Private Equity Association and directly participated in a number of institutional efforts which resulted in regulatory improvements and better understanding of the segment by both government authorities and capital markets institutions. Álvaro Gonçalves also serves in the Listing Committee of BM&F Bovespa, the Brazilian Stock Exchange, where he leads discussions about the access of mid-market companies to the stock market. In the international context, Gonçalves serves at governing bodies of EMPEA – the Global Emerging Markets Private Equity Association (member of the Advisory Council) and LAVCA – the Latin American Private Equity and Venture Capital Association (Board of Directors). Prior to this, Gonçalves built a solid career as corporate executive, including the leadership of two turnarounds of national segment leaders: in 1996, as CEO of Lacta, the number one chocolate producer in the country; and in 1990, as CFO of the Pullman Group, a leading Brazilian bakery products company. Gonçalves led a successful turnaround in both cases to achieve sustainable profitability. In addition to these two highly visible cases, Gonçalves advised restructuring situations as manager of Banco Pactual’s corporate finance division, in 1994.

Education
Gonçalves began his career in 1984 at Duratex (part of Itau Group), a mid-market supplier for the civil construction sector. Gonçalves holds a BSc in Industrial Engineering from FEI (Brazil), with extensions in Business Administration from FGV-SP (Brazil) and an MBA degree from the International Institute for Management Development in Switzerland.

References

Living people
Brazilian chief executives
Private equity and venture capital investors
Year of birth missing (living people)